This is a list of battles in World War I in which the Ottoman Empire fought. The Ottoman Empire fought on many fronts including the Eastern, Romanian and Macedonian fronts. Only battles in which the Ottoman Empire was one of the major belligerents are shown.

The list

See also
 List of battles involving the Ottoman Empire
 List of Ottoman battles in the 20th century
 List of battles of the Turkish War of Independence

 
World War 1 battles